Chutes-des-Passes/Lac Margane Water Aerodrome  is located on Lac Margane, Quebec, Canada. It is open from mid-May to November.

References

Registered aerodromes in Saguenay–Lac-Saint-Jean
Seaplane bases in Quebec